Sing is a 2016 American computer-animated jukebox musical comedy film produced by Illumination Entertainment and distributed by Universal Pictures. It is the first film of the franchise of the same name. It was written and directed by Garth Jennings,and co-directed by Christophe Lourdelet (in his feature directorial debut). It was produced by Chris Meledandri and Janet Healy. The film stars the ensemble voices of Matthew McConaughey, Reese Witherspoon, Seth MacFarlane, Scarlett Johansson, John C. Reilly, Tori Kelly, Taron Egerton, Nick Kroll, Beck Bennett, Jay Pharoah, Leslie Jones, Laraine Newman, Peter Serafinowicz, Nick Offerman, Rhea Perlman, and Jennifer Saunders. 

Set in a world inhabited by anthropomorphic animals, the film focuses on a struggling theater owner who stages a singing competition in an effort to prevent his theater from entering foreclosure, as well as how the competition interferes with the personal lives of its contestants.

The film features more than 60 songs from famous artists, mostly performed diegetically. It also has an original song by Stevie Wonder and Ariana Grande called "Faith", which was nominated for a Golden Globe. Aside from these songs, Joby Talbot composed the film's score. Sing first screened during the Toronto International Film Festival on September 11, 2016, followed by its premiere at the Microsoft Theater in Los Angeles on December 3. It was then theatrically released in the United States on December 21, by Universal Pictures and grossed $634 million worldwide.

A sequel, Sing 2, was released on December 22, 2021.

Plot

In Calatonia, a city of anthropomorphic animals, koala Buster Moon owns a struggling theater, and is threatened with foreclosure by bank representative llama Judith. He decides to hold a singing competition with a prize of $1,000, but a typo made by his elderly assistant iguana Miss Crawly adds two extra zeros to the prize money. The misprinted flyers are blown out of the window by a fan before they can be proofread, and float across the city.

Crowds of animals gather to audition, and Buster selects his contestants. Among them are housewife and mother of 25 piglets Rosita; punk-rock porcupine Ash; teenage gorilla Johnny, son of a criminal gang leader named Big Daddy; street musician mouse Mike; and an exuberant pig named Gunter. Teenage elephant Meena fails her audition due to stage fright, Ash's self-absorbed boyfriend and co-auditionee Lance is upset to be dismissed from the contest, and Rosita is paired with Gunter for a dance routine. After Buster discovers the flyers advertise a prize of $100,000, he joins his friend sheep Eddie on a visit to Eddie's wealthy grandmother, former theater superstar Nana Noodleman. Nana is reluctant to sponsor the prize money, but agrees to attend a private preview of the show before making a decision.

Pressured by her grandfather, Meena attempts to request a second audition, but settles on being Buster's stagehand instead. After some acts withdraw from the competition, Meena is offered a spot in the show, but again struggles to overcome her fear. Further problems soon arise. Rosita flounders in her dance routine with Gunter, believing her motherly duties have caused her to lose her passion. Lance cheats on Ash, causing her to break up with him, and later to break down crying during a rehearsal. Mike, assuming he will win the competition, takes out a massive loan from the bank to buy a flashy car and swindles a group of bears in a card game. Johnny, forced by Big Daddy to partake in a heist as a getaway driver, sneaks away to a rehearsal. Traffic prevents Johnny from returning to the heist in time, resulting in the arrest and incarceration of Big Daddy and his gang, straining their relationship. After an accident causes stage lights to fall and break, Buster has the stage rebuilt and fills a glass tank with water so that luminescent squids can be used to light the stage.

Desperate, Johnny attempts to steal the prize money for his father's bail, but when he sees a note on Buster's desk praising his talents, Johnny resolves to focus on his musical career instead. At the same time, Rosita regains her passion for dancing while grocery shopping, and Ash composes a song that Buster likes. On the day of the preview, the bears Mike had cheated locate him, and demand their money back. Mike directs them to Buster; the bears break open the prize chest, but it is nowhere near $100,000. Shocked by the lack of money, the rest of the contestants question Buster, and the squid tank shatters under everyone's weight. The flooded theater implodes and Judith repossesses the lot, while a disheartened Buster takes up residence with Eddie and supports himself by washing cars.

Meena goes to the rubble of the theater and sings out loud to music on her headphones, inspiring Buster to stage an outdoor show. Despite attempts from Judith to halt the show, it takes place on the lot of the former theater, with Meena's and Rosita's families in attendance. More animals are drawn into the audience when the show is broadcast live on the local news. Rosita's husband Norman is roused by his wife's talent, Big Daddy breaks out of prison and travels to the lot to reconcile with Johnny and apologize, Lance is impressed by Ash's original rock song "Set It All Free," the bears find Mike and chase him away, and Meena overcomes her stage fright and gives an enthusiastic performance. The show is a success and impresses Nana who was in the audience. She purchases the lot, and the theater is rebuilt and reopened.

Voice cast

 Matthew McConaughey as Buster Moon, an optimistic koala who plans to save his theater from closure by holding a singing competition
 Reese Witherspoon as Rosita, a pig who gave up her teenage music dreams to become a devoted housewife, and mother of 25 piglets
 Seth MacFarlane as Mike, a white mouse street singer with a big Frank Sinatra-esque voice and an arrogant attitude
 Scarlett Johansson as Ash, a teenage porcupine punk rocker who takes part in an alternative-rock music duo with her boyfriend Lance
 John C. Reilly as Eddie Noodleman, a sheep and Buster's friend who doubts the future of the theater
 Taron Egerton as Johnny, a teenage gorilla who wants to sing, though his father would rather have him follow his criminal footsteps
 Tori Kelly as Meena, a teenage elephant with an exquisite voice and severe stage fright

 Jennifer Saunders as Nana Noodleman, Eddie's grandmother who was a famous singer in her glory days
 Jennifer Hudson as Young Nana

 Garth Jennings as Miss Crawly, an elderly iguana with a glass eye who is Buster's administrative assistant
 Peter Serafinowicz as Big Daddy, a gorilla gang leader who wants his son Johnny to follow in his crime business
 Nick Kroll as Gunter, a passionate dancing pig who is partnered with Rosita for the show
 Beck Bennett as Lance, a porcupine and Ash's self-absorbed boyfriend
 Jay Pharoah as Meena's grandfather, who pressures her to overcome her stage fright
 Nick Offerman as Norman, a pig and Rosita's workaholic husband
 Leslie Jones as Meena's mother

 Rhea Perlman as Judith, a brown llama from the bank who warns Buster that his theater will be repossessed if he does not pay
 Laraine Newman as Meena's grandmother
 Adam Buxton as Stan, a gorilla who is a member of Big Daddy's gang
 Brad Morris as an unnamed baboon whom Mike attacks for not donating more money to his street performances
 Bill Farmer as Bob, a dog who documents Buster's singing competition

The voices of Rosita and Norman's piglet children were provided by Oscar, Leo, Caspar, and Asa Jennings, the children of Garth Jennings. Jennings had directors Edgar Wright (as a goat) and Wes Anderson (as Daniel, a giraffe who auditions with the song "Ben") provide "additional voices", continuing a tradition of the three friends appearing in each other's films. An archival recording of Shooby Taylor, who died in 2003, singing "Stout-Hearted Men" was used for the singing voice of a hippopotamus.

Production
In January 2014, it was announced that Garth Jennings would write and direct an animated comedy film for Universal Pictures and Illumination Entertainment, about "courage, competition and carrying a tune". It was originally titled Lunch, then retitled Sing.

On January 14, 2015, Matthew McConaughey was cast in the film's lead voice role. Chris Meledandri and Janet Healy produced the film. On June 17, 2015, it was confirmed that McConaughey's character was named Buster and that John C. Reilly would voice Eddie, a sheep and Buster's best friend. In November 2015, it was announced that Reese Witherspoon, Seth MacFarlane, Scarlett Johansson, Tori Kelly and Taron Egerton had joined the cast.

According to a Hollywood Reporter interview and article, "The film contains 65 non-stop pop songs", the rights to which cost 15% of the film's $75 million budget. The animation was created entirely in France by Illumination Mac Guff.

Music

Release
The nearly complete film was screened as a work in progress beginning September 11, 2016 at the Toronto International Film Festival. Universal Studios released the film on December 21, 2016.

Home media
Sing was released on DVD, Blu-ray, Blu-ray 3D and 4K Ultra HD Blu-ray on March 21, 2017. It includes three short films: Gunter Babysits, Love at First Sight, and Eddie's Life Coach. The film made a revenue of $63 million with 3.3 million units sold, making it the seventh best-selling title of 2017.

Reception

Box office

Sing grossed $270.3 million in the United States and Canada, and $363.8 million in other territories, for a worldwide total of $634.1 million, against a production budget of $75 million. Deadline Hollywood calculated the net profit of the film to be $194.2 million, accounting for production budgets, marketing, talent participations, and other costs, with box office grosses, and ancillary revenues from home media, placing it seventh on their list of 2016's "Most Valuable Blockbusters".

In North America, the film opened alongside Passengers and Assassin's Creed, and was expected to gross around $70 million from 4,022 theaters over its first six days of release. The film made $1.7 million during its Tuesday night previews. It went on to gross $35.2 million in its opening weekend (a six-day total of $75.5 million), finishing second at the box office behind Rogue One, which was in its second week. It rose 21% in its second weekend to $42.9 million, remaining in second, and grossed $20.8 million in its third week and finishing third. Sing holds the record for being the highest-grossing film to never finish first at the North American box office, beating My Big Fat Greek Wedding ($241.4 million in 2002).

Critical response
The site's critical consensus reads, "Sing delivers colorfully animated, cheerfully undemanding entertainment with a solid voice cast and a warm-hearted – albeit familiar – storyline that lives up to its title." On Metacritic, the film has a weighted average score of 59 out of 100 based on 37 critics, indicating "mixed or average reviews". Audiences polled by CinemaScore gave the film an average grade of "A" on an A+ to F scale.

Brian Truitt of USA Today gave the film three-and-a-half out of four stars and wrote, "In a year full of talking-animal hits, Sing isn't quite as strong a number. It's a tale that might not be particularly thought-provoking but sure is toe-tapping." In her review for the Los Angeles Times, Katie Walsh called Sing, "a cute movie with genuinely funny moments (keep an eye out for the koala car wash), and some great tunes to boot." The Arizona Republics Bill Goodykoontz was rather mixed about the film in his review and overall said, "Sing is like an album with a good song here and there, but too much filler and not enough hits." Reviewing the version of the film screened at the Toronto International Film Festival, Stefan Pape of the British website HeyUGuys gave the film a mixed review of 2/5, stating that "Garth Jennings's Sing effectively acknowledges early on that it's following a completely unoriginal formula, and yet carries on regardless." While Peter Debruge of Variety, who also saw the film during the same festival, did not find the subplots to have any "profound life lessons", he overall praised Jennings' direction, the cast's voice performances and the film's silliness.

Accolades

Sequel

A month after the film's release, Universal and Illumination announced plans for a sequel with writer/director Jennings, producers Meledandri and Healy, and the original cast returning for it. The film was originally scheduled for release on December 25, 2020, but the date was pushed back to July 2, 2021, accommodating the release of The Croods: A New Age. Sing 2 release date was further pushed back to December 22, 2021.

References

External links

 
 
 

2010s American animated films
2010s musical comedy films
2016 3D films
2016 comedy films
2016 computer-animated films
2016 films
3D animated films
American children's animated comedy films
American children's animated musical films
American computer-animated films
American musical comedy films
Animated films about animals
Films about competitions
Films directed by Garth Jennings
Films produced by Chris Meledandri
Films produced by Janet Healy
Films set in a theatre

Illumination (company) animated films
Jukebox musical films
Universal Pictures animated films
Universal Pictures films
2010s English-language films